MEI International Academy (abbreviated as MEI) is a study abroad organization that specializes in experiential learning, academic coursework, and educational travel. Founded in 1997 by Joe and Rita Mei, the company aims to offer a global high school experience. Thousands of students have graduated from MEI programs.

Programs 
MEI operates over 30 study abroad programs across six continents: Asia, Europe, South America, North America, Africa, and Australia. All programs are designed for high school and gap year students, and are organized by term (with 4 terms making up a school year), besides the 16 programs that run throughout the summer. Students can choose to embark on a single term or opt for a longer experience by choosing a variation of term programs to make up a semester or year of study abroad.

Notable courses 
MEI is headquartered in Caledon, Ontario, and is accredited by the Ontario Ministry of Education through the Upper Grand District School Board; however, MEI also accepts international students. Students from schools outside of Ontario may have academic courses accredited by their individual schools or local school boards. Course credits from MEI appear on student academic records and can be used for university entrance. MEI offers a mix of subjects and programs that have a 9:1 student/teacher ratio. No dedicated classrooms are used as lectures are delivered on location. Courses offered to vary from program to program, and include Ancient and Modern World History, International Business, Modern Media and Photography, and Writer’s Craft.

Recognition 
 GoOverseas Community Choice Awards Category Winner 2018
 GoOverseas Community Choice Awards Category Winner 2020

See also 

 EF Education
 Neuchâtel Junior College
 Blyth Education

References 

Private schools in Ontario
Companies based in Ontario
Canadian international schools
Educational institutions established in 1997
International schools in Ontario
1997 establishments in Ontario
International educational organizations